"Drank in My Cup" is a song by American rapper Kirko Bangz. It is taken from his mixtape Progression 2: A Young Texas Playa. The Sound M.O.B. produced single is his highest-charting song to date and has sold over 1,000,000 copies digitally. The song uses the word 'drank' a number of times as a clear reference to purple drank, a codeine-promethazine cocktail served in Sprite, a drink symbolic of the H-Town hip-hop scene, classically associated with chopped and screwed music. The song is full of references to this music scene, including the slow, relaxed rhythm of the song.

Remixes
The official remix features 2 Chainz and Juelz Santana. J. Cole originally did a freestyle to the instrumentals. Kirko Bangz also released a version of the remix with his vocals from the official remix. Rapper Bow Wow did another freestyle to "Drank in My Cup". 2 Chainz freestyled over the instrumentals to the song. Chamillionaire did a freestyle over the song called "I Think I'm in Love". Singer Trey Songz also did a freestyle to the song. Rapper Mysonne did a freestyle to the song. Rapper Ransom also freestyled to the song. Los Angeles rapper Kid Ink, who is a member of the 2012 XXL Freshman Class has also done a remix to this song called "Stank in My Blunt". Tyga did a remix called "Ready to Fuck" from his "Well Done 3" mixtape. Rapper Redman did a remix called "Smoke, Drank and Fuck," in which he kept part of the original chorus and Bangz's second verse from the original song. Rachel Sharkey is also featured in the music video.

Chart performance
The song debuted at number 115 on the Hip Hop Digital Singles chart on the week ending of August 15, 2012. It peaked at number 28 on the Billboard Hot 100, becoming his first and only top 40 hit to date. The song has so far sold 1,000,000 copies in the United States alone.

Track listing
 Digital single

 Digital Remix EP

Charts and certifications

Weekly charts

Certifications

Year-end charts

References

External links
 Rap Critic Reviews 'Drank in My Cup' by Kirko Bangz

2011 singles
2011 songs
Kirko Bangz songs
Warner Records singles